Acestridium colombiense is a species of armored catfish endemic to Colombia. It is only known from the Inírida River, Guainía Department in the east of Colombia.

Like all Acestridium species, this is a very slender and elongated fish. Specimens of up to  SL have been recorded. It can most readily distinguished from its congeners by its rather homogenous brown coloration (as opposed to having striped markings) and the very low number of jaw teeth.

References
 

Hypoptopomatini
Fish of South America
Freshwater fish of Colombia
Taxa named by Michael Eugene Retzer
Fish described in 2005